Mae Sai (Shan:) is the northernmost district (amphoe) of Chiang Rai province in northern Thailand. The town of Mae Sai is a major border crossing between Thailand and Myanmar.  Asian Highway Network AH2 (Thailand Route 1 or Phahonyothin Road) crosses the Mae Sai River to the town Tachileik in Myanmar.

One-day passes for non-Burmese nationals crossing into Myanmar are issued at Myanmar customs in Tachileik. Passports are confiscated and a temporary travel permit is issued; the permit is exchanged for the traveler's passport upon crossing back into Thailand. (No longer available as of 2016.) Since the changes in Thai immigration policy since March 2016, crossing this border as a foreign national is highly depended on individual Thai customs officers, as they have discretion. 

Geography
Neighboring districts are (from the east clockwise): Chiang Saen, Mae Chan, and Mae Fa Luang. To the north is Myanmar, separated by the Mae Sai River and the Ruak River. The westernmost part of the district is dominated by the hills of the Daen Lao Range, the most important one is the Doi Tung with the Wat Phra That Doi Tung temple on top. Doi Nang Non is another notable mountain in Mae Sai District.

History
The minor district (king amphoe) Mae Sai was created on 1 March 1939, when the two tambons Mae Sai and Pong Pha were split off from Chiang Saen District. The area was upgraded to a full district on 1 May 1950.

Administration

The district is divided into eight subdistricts (tambons), which in turn are further subdivided into 92 villages (mubans). There are two subdistrict municipalities (thesaban tambons) in the district: Mai Sai itself covering parts of the tambons Mae Sai and Wiang Phang Kham, and Huai Khrai covering parts of tambon Huai Khrai. There are a further eight tambon administrative organizations (TAO).

The geocode 7 is not used.

References

External links

amphoe.com (Thai)
http://www.maesai.go.th Website of Mae Sai township (Thai)

Districts of Chiang Rai province
Cities and towns in Thailand